James or Jim Howard may refer to:

Government and politics
 James Howard, 3rd Earl of Suffolk (1619–1688/1607–1688), grandson of Thomas Howard
 James Scott Howard (1798–1866), Canadian public servant
 James Howard (Whig politician) (1814–1882), British Whig MP
 James Howard (agriculturalist) (1821–1889), British Liberal MP, manufacturer and agriculturalist
 James L. Howard (1818–1906), American businessman and Lieutenant Governor of Connecticut
 James J. Howard (1927–1988), American educator and former U.S. congressman from New Jersey

Entertainment
 James Howard (dramatist) (died 1669), English dramatist
 James Newton Howard (born 1951), American film score composer
 James Howard (writer) (born 1956), screenwriter, poet, computer game creator

Other
 James H. Howard (1913–1995), U.S Medal of Honor recipient in World War II
 James M. Howard Jr. (1922–2002), American teacher and educational advocate
 James F. Howard Jr. (born 1948), American medical academic
 Jim Howard (high jumper) (born 1959), American athlete
 James Howard (mathematician) (born 1979), American mathematician
 Jimmy Howard (born 1984), American ice hockey goaltender
 James Howard (basketball)